Lewis Norman Mander, FAA, FRS (8 September 1939 – 8 February 2020) was a New Zealand-born Australian organic chemist. He has widely explored the synthesis and chemistry of the gibberellin class of diterpenes over a 20-year period at the Australian National University (ANU). In particular, he studied the effect of these hormones on stem growth and on the reasons why plant undergo bolting during plant development. The July 2004 edition of the Australian Journal of Chemistry was dedicated to Mander on the occasion of his 65th birthday. He retired in 2002 but remained active at the ANU until 2014. In 2018 Mander was made a Companion in the General Division in the Order of Australia which "...is awarded for eminent achievement and merit of the highest degree in service to Australia or humanity at large".
In an interview he gave after winning his award, Mander said that his goal was to improve the efficiency of extracting food from plants with the possibility of reducing food shortages in the future.

Education

Mander completed a BSc degree at the University of Auckland, New Zealand in 1960, followed by an MSc degree in 1961 from the same institution.
He then moved to Australia in 1962 to undertake a PhD degree at the University of Sydney before committing to an initial postdoctoral fellowship at the University of Michigan. Mander then moved to Caltech in 1965 (after his PhD had been conferred) for an additional two years.

Career
Mander returned to Australia in 1966 to become a lecturer in organic chemistry at the University of Adelaide. He was promoted to Senior Lecturer in organic chemistry in 1970, where he remained until 1975. During this time Mander visited the University of Cambridge to research "...pathways to the pigments of life". In 1977, he served as a Fulbright Senior Scholar at the California Institute of Technology. He was a distinguished Alumnus Professor at the University of Auckland in 1992 and an Eminent Scientist of RIKEN at Wako, in Saitama Prefecture, Japan from 1995 to 1996.

In Australia, he relocated to the Australian National University Research School of Chemistry as a Senior Fellow. He retired in 2002 but retained the title of Professor Emeritus at the Australian National University.

Death

Mander died at home in Canberra, Australia on 8 February 2020, at age 80.

Research interests
 In the early days, Mander was involved in extracting chemicals in plants that might help fight against cancer. Eventually, he turned his research skills to “...the gibberellin family of plant bioregulators". He further developed his interest in this chemical group to include an understanding of their role in plant development. Professor Sir Alan R. Battersby said that Mander's “...synthesis of gibberellic acid was a brilliant landmark achievement. This molecule is of daunting complexity and he developed two flexible routes to it, both depending on many ingenious and novel synthetic procedures".
Amongst his many scholarly activities, Mander contributed a chapter on 'Stereoselective Synthesis' to the classic text 'Stereochemistry of Organic Compounds' by Professors Ernest L. Eliel and Samuel H. Wilen.

Other interests include:
Synthesis and preparation of semi-synthetic derivatives of gibberellins.
Molecular basis of plant growth regulation with gibberellins.
Synthesis of diterpenoid natural products with high bioactivity.
Dissolving metal-mediated reductive alkylation of benzenoid synthons.
C-selective acylation of enolates using methyl cyanoformate (Mander's reagent).

Fellowships and awards
Nuffield Commonwealth Fellow 1971–1972 (Cambridge)
Fulbright Senior Scholar (California Institute of Technology, 1977, and Harvard University, 1986)
H.G. Smith Memorial Medal 1981 (RACI)
Member of the Australian Academy of Science 1983
Flintoff Medal and Prize (RSC) 1990
Fellow of the Royal Society of London 1990
Hon. Fellow of the Royal Society of New Zealand 1991 (FRSNZ Hon)
Made a Companion of the Order of Australia "for eminent service to science through pioneering contributions to organic chemistry in the field of plant growth hormones, to higher education as an academic, researcher and author, and to national and international scientific societies".

Representative Publications
King G.R., Mander L.N., Monck N.J.T., Morris J.C. and Zhang H. A New and Efficient Strategy for the Total Synthesis of Polycyclic Diterpenoids: The Preparation of Gibberellins (±)-GA103 and (±)-GA73. J. Am. Chem. Soc. 1997, 119, 3828–3829.
Frey, B., Wells, A. P., Rogers, D. R. and Mander, L. N. Synthesis of the Unusual Diterpenoid Tropones, Hainanolidol and Harringtonolide. J. Am. Chem. Soc. 1998, 120, 1914–1915.
Mander, L. N. Twenty years of gibberellin research. Natural Product Reports, 2003, 20, 49–69.
Mander, L. N. and McLachlan, M. M. Total synthesis of the Galbulimima alkaloid GB 13. J. Am. Chem. Soc., 2003, 125, 2400–2401.
Mander, L. N. and Thomson, R. J. Total synthesis of Sordaricin. Org. Lett., 2003, 5, 1321–1324.

References

1939 births
2020 deaths
New Zealand chemists
Australian chemists
Organic chemists
Harvard University people
New Zealand emigrants to Australia
Academic staff of the University of Adelaide
University of Auckland alumni
University of Sydney alumni
Fellows of the Australian Academy of Science
Fellows of the Royal Society of New Zealand
New Zealand Fellows of the Royal Society
University of Michigan fellows
Companions of the Order of Australia